Westmoreland Historic District may refer to:

Westmoreland Historic District (Toledo, Ohio), listed on the National Register of Historic Places in Lucas County, Ohio
Westmoreland Historic District (Houston, Texas), listed on the National Register of Historic Places in Harris County, Texas